Dragontrail, manufactured by AGC Inc., is an alkali-aluminosilicate sheet glass engineered for a combination of thinness, lightness and damage-resistance, similar to Corning's proprietary Gorilla Glass.  The material's primary properties are its strength, allowing thin glass without fragility; its high scratch resistance; and its hardness with a Vickers hardness test rating of 595 to 673.

Cell phones 
To date, some of the cell phone models that have incorporated Dragontrail protection are:

 Alcatel 7 (By Metro PCS)
 Alcatel Idol Alpha
 Alcatel Hero 2
 Alcatel One Touch Conquest
 Alcatel One Touch Idol 3
 Alcatel One Touch Idol 4 Pro
 Alcatel Tetra
 Alcatel TCL LX
Allview P8 Energy mini
 Allview V2 Viper i
 Allview V1 Viper i4G
 Allview Viper E
 Allview W1i
 Allview W1s
 Allview X2 Soul Lite
 Allview X2 Soul Style
 Allview X2 Soul Style + Platinum
 BlackBerry DTEK 50/60
 BlackBerry Motion
 Bq Aquaris
 Cherry Mobile 4/S4/S4 Plus/G1
 Crosscall Trekker-S1
 Doro 8080
 Elephone P8000
 eSTAR X45
 Flipkart Billion Capture+
 Galaxy Nexus
 Getnord Onyx
 Gionee Marathon M5 lite
 Google Pixel 3a and 3a XL 
 Haier Esteem I70
 Highscreen Power Rage Evo
 i-mobile IQ 6
 InnJoo One
 InnJoo Two 
 Kruger&Matz DRIVE 3
 Lava Iris 504q
 Lava Pixel V1
 Lava Pixel V2
 Lava X8 
 Lenovo K3 Note (Also known as Lenovo A7000 Turbo in India, Model Number: K50a40) 
 Lenovo ThinkPad Yoga 12
 LYF WATER 5 
 Meizu M2
 Meizu M2 note
 Oplus XonPhone 5
 Oukitel K10
 Philips Xenium I908
 Polytron Prime 7
 Samsung Galaxy J3 (2016)
 Samsung Galaxy M10, M20, M30s
 Samsung Galaxy On5, On7, On5 Pro, On7 Pro  
 Sony Ericsson Xperia Active
 Sony Ericsson Xperia Acro S
 Sony Xperia X Performance
 Sony Xperia Z
 Sony Xperia Z1
 Sony Xperia Z2
 Sony Xperia Z3
 Sony Xperia Z5
 Sony Xperia Z5 Premium
 Stonex One
 TrekStor WinPhone 4.7 HD
 UMi Z
 V341U
 Videocon Krypton3 V50JG
 WE T1
 Wileyfox Spark/Spark+/SparkX
 Xiaomi Redmi 1S/2/2 Prime 
 XOLO 8X-1000
 XOLO BLACK 1X
 XOLO Q1000
 XOLO Q1010i
 XOLO Win Q900s
 ZTE Avid Plus
 ZTE Obsidian
 ZTE Sonata 2

References

External links 
 
 Patent
 
Dragontrail Glass comparison with Gorilla Glass

Materials science
Glass engineering and science
Glass applications
Glass trademarks and brands
Japanese brands